Toni Gonzaga is an independent and the  eponymous debut studio album under Prime Music Inc. released on July 26, 2002, in CD format only, in the Philippines. All songs were recorded and mixed at Greenhill Sound Productions, Inc. The album was not known in years due to loss of promotions and the difficulty for her to engage in bigger market, until Gonzaga herself given the chance to showcase her talent as a singer in late 2005 when she released her first commercial single, We Belong. However, Hanggang Ngayon was Gonzaga's first credit as a songwriter.

In early 2013, Toni Gonzaga was adopted by Viva Video, Inc. for nationwide distribution exclusively in Atroplus stores. The Viva team had made some changes on the album including the new set of tracks list from 5 to 11 numbers.

Track listing
The track list was taken  from Pinoy Exchange.

Toni Gonzaga

2013 version

 track 1, "Paano" (How) was originally recorded by Gary Valenciano.
 track 1, "Akala Ko'y Para Sa 'Kin" (I Thought It was Meant for Me) was originally recorded by Allona.

Personnel
 Ricky C Lo –executive producer
 Fredie Saturno –album producer
 Fred M. Davis –overall consultant
 Joseph De Vera (of INX unlimited) –digital imaging expert and designer
 Raymund Isaac (of Prortfolio) –album photographer
 Dante San Pedro & Rick Meneses –recording engineers
 Dante San Pedro –mixing engineer
 Tito Cayamanda –additional guitarist for the tracks
 Jojo Villalva –addition vocal supervisor for song ‘’Paano’’ (except for ‘’Paano’’, produced by Nonoy Tan)

References

2001 debut albums
Toni Gonzaga albums